Camille Neddo Johnson (born September 12, 1963) has been the 18th Relief Society General President of the Church of Jesus Christ of Latter-day Saints (LDS Church) since August 2022. She previously served as the church's 14th Primary General President from April 2021 to August 2022.

Biography
Johnson was born in Pocatello, Idaho. She obtained a bachelor’s degree in English in 1985 from the University of Utah and a Juris Doctor degree in 1989 from the University of Utah Law School. Johnson worked as a lawyer for more than 30 years, most recently with Snow, Christensen & Martineau. In her legal career, Johnson worked as an advisor and litigator on issues including risk management, employment claims, Fair Labor Standards Act, ADA, whistle-blowing, procedural due process, and pharmaceutical defense.

LDS Church service
From 2016 to 2019, Johnson and her husband served as leaders of the Peru Arequipa Mission. In the Primary general presidency, Susan H. Porter and Amy Wright served as Johnson's first and second counselors, respectively.

On August 1, 2022, Johnson transitioned from being the general president of the Primary to having the same title in the Relief Society organization.  She was succeeded in the Primary by Porter.  J. Anette Dennis and Kristin M. Yee are serving as her counselors in the Relief Society general presidency.

Personal life
Johnson married Douglas R. Johnson in 1987 and they are the parents of three children.

References

External links
 Camille N. Johnson Leadership Profile
 Camille N. Johnson Snow, Christensen & Martineau Profile

See also
 List of general officers of The Church of Jesus Christ of Latter-day Saints

1963 births
Living people
Latter Day Saints from Idaho
University of Utah alumni
General Presidents of the Primary (LDS Church)
Utah lawyers
Female Mormon missionaries
Mission presidents (LDS Church)
American Mormon missionaries in Peru
S.J. Quinney College of Law alumni